Soegiarto Adikoesoemo (born 1938)  is an Indonesian billionaire businessman and the founder of AKR Corporindo.

Career
Soegiarto started a small chemical trading business in Surabaya and incorporated PT Aneka Kimia Raya in 1978, which traded and distributed basic chemicals in Indonesia.

Soegiarto built Sorini a manufacturing plant for sorbitol in Indonesia and Khalista in China, and grew both plants to become one of the biggest producers in Asia.

He is president commissioner of PT AKR Corporindo TBK.

Personal life
He is married, with two children, and lives in Surabaya, Jakarta, Indonesia.

His son Haryanto Adikoesoemo opened the Museum of Modern and Contemporary Art (Museum MACAN) in Kebun Jeruk, a suburb of Jakarta, with 800 contemporary and modern art works from his collection.

References

Living people
Soegiarto
Indonesian businesspeople
Indonesian people of Chinese descent
1930s births
Indonesian billionaires